Petra Gössi is a Swiss politician. She has served as a member of the  Swiss National Council and has been the leader of the FDP.The Liberals party since 2016.

Gössi was born in Lucerne but raised in Küssnacht am Rigi in the canton of Schwyz. She went to high school in Immensee and graduated from the University of Bern with a law degree. She worked as a tax and business consultant.

In 2004, she was elected to the Cantonal Council of Schwyz. At the age of 32, she became the council president and served in that role until 2011, when she was elected to the National Council. She was also selected as the FDP leader in Schwyz. 

In 2016, Gössi succeeded Philipp Müller as the leader of the national FDP. She is the second woman to lead the party.

Personal life
Gössi is a native German speaker but speaks Italian well as her mother was from Ticino. She also speaks French.

She generally does not speak about her private life, only saying that she is in a partnership.

References

External links
Official page
FDP profile

1976 births
Living people
21st-century Swiss politicians
Members of the National Council (Switzerland)
University of Bern alumni
Swiss women lawyers
Women members of the National Council (Switzerland)
People from the canton of Schwyz